Charles Furman Gooch (June 5, 1902 – May 30, 1982) was a professional baseball player.  He was a first baseman and third baseman for one season (1929) with the Washington Senators.  For his career, he compiled a .281 batting average in 57 at-bats, with five runs batted in.

He was born in Smyrna, Tennessee and died in Lanham, Maryland at the age of 79.

External links

1902 births
1982 deaths
Washington Senators (1901–1960) players
Major League Baseball first basemen
Major League Baseball third basemen
Baseball players from Tennessee
Augusta Tygers players
Springfield Midgets players
Salt Lake City Bees players
Hollywood Stars players
Chattanooga Lookouts players
Kansas City Blues (baseball) players
Birmingham Barons players
San Antonio Indians players
Reading Keystones players
Albany Senators players
Knoxville Smokies players
People from Smyrna, Tennessee